Cuckney Castle was in the village of Cuckney, Nottinghamshire between Worksop and Market Warsop.

It was a motte and bailey fortress founded by Thomas de Cuckney. It was razed after The Anarchy in the reign of King Stephen.  There are now the low remains of a motte, partly enclosed by a wide ditch and to the west the faint remnants of a bailey. These remains can be found at the edge of the churchyard of St Mary's Church, Norton Cuckney.

Cuckney motte and bailey castle is listed as a Scheduled Monument by the Department for Digital, Culture, Media and Sport.

In the 1950s, a mass grave of approximately 200 human remains was found in a trench near the churchyard, leading to speculation regarding a battle near the site.

Gallery

See also
Adulterine castle

References

 Fry, Plantagenet Somerset, The David & Charles Book of Castles, David & Charles, 1980. 

Castles in Nottinghamshire
Motte-and-bailey castles
Bassetlaw District